The Spice of Life is a smooth jazz studio album by Earl Klugh released in April 2008. The album received a Grammy nomination for Best Pop Instrumental Album at the 51st Grammy Awards in 2009.

Track listing 
"Ocean Blue" - 5:10
"Sleepyhead" - 5:09
"Canadian Sunset" - 5:34
"Venezuelan Nights" - 2:35
"Driftin'" - 3:48
"Snap!" - 4:41
"Bye Ya" - 3:59
"Heart of My Life" - 4:14
"Morning in Rio" - 5:27
"C'est si bon" - 4:53
"Lucy's World" - 3:49
"My Foolish Heart" - 6:18
"The Toy Guitar" - 2:36

Charts

References 

Earl Klugh albums
2008 albums